Radical 29 or radical again meaning "and", "again" or "right hand" is one of the 23 Kangxi radicals (214 radicals total) composed of two strokes.

In the Kangxi Dictionary, there are 91 characters (out of 49,030) to be found under this radical.

 is also the 24th indexing component in the Table of Indexing Chinese Character Components predominantly adopted by Simplified Chinese dictionaries published in mainland China.

Evolution

The radical character 's ancient form is a pictogram of a right hand from which the modern Chinese character  (right) was derived. Though 又 (again) as a modern Chinese character no longer represents the meaning of "right", the implication of "hand" is preserved in some Chinese characters fall under radical 29.

Derived characters

Literature

External links

Unihan Database - U+53C8

029
024